Uparati, is a Sanskrit word and it literally means "cessation, quietism, stopping worldly action". It is an important concept in Advaita Vedanta pursuit of moksha and refers to the ability to achieve "dispassion", and "discontinuation of religious ceremonies".

According to Adi Shankara Uparati or Uparama is the strict observance of one’s own Dharma. Sama is the restraining of the outgoing mental propensities i.e. the curbing of the mind from all objects other than hearing etc., and Dama is the restraining of the external sense-organs from all objects other than that. Uparati is Pratyahara, the withdrawing of the Self (Vedantasara Slokas 18-20). These essentials along with Titiksha i.e. endurance of pairs of opposites, Samadhana i.e. constant concentration of the mind, Śraddhā i.e. faith in the truths of Vedanta, which are the six-fold inner-wealth  prepare one eager for liberation to gain the knowledge of Brahman. Effort is involved in inculcating Sama and Dama but the exercise of Uparati requires no efforts. In the state of Uparati, which is total renunciation of actions i.e. enjoined duties, one discovers an inner poise, silence or joy. The mind which is conditioned to fulfil duties is not free to pursue knowledge. It is through renunciation that a few seekers have attained immortality – not through rituals, progeny or wealth – "na karmana na prajya dhanena tyagenaike amrtatvamamasuh" – Kaivalya Upanishad, 3. Immortality is the state when becoming and being are one.

Whereas the fruit of Vairagya is Bodha i.e. spiritual wisdom, the fruit of Bodha is Uparati. The best Uparati (self-withdrawal) is that condition of the thought waves in which they are free from influences of external objects (Vivekachudamani Slokas 23). Uparati is the abstaining on principle from engaging in any acts and ceremonies enjoined by the Shastras; otherwise, it is the state of the mind which is always engaged in Sravana and the rest, without ever diverging from them.

References

Vedanta
Hindu philosophical concepts